Cataract Lake is a lake in Coconino County which is located near Williams in North Central Arizona.

Fish species
 Rainbow Trout
 Brown Trout
 Largemouth Bass
 Crappie
 Sunfish
 Catfish (Channel)

References

External links
 Arizona Boating Locations Facilities Map
 Arizona Fishing Locations Map
 Video of Cataract Lake
 Kaibab National Forest – Cataract Lake

Lakes of Arizona
Lakes of Coconino County, Arizona